Arkansas Highway 29 is a state highway that extends  in South Arkansas. It runs north from the Louisiana state line to its terminus at AR 301 in Antoine.  It is intersected by many major thoroughfares including Interstate 30.  Part of the highway is known as Bill Clinton Drive.

Route description

Maintained by the Arkansas State Highway and Transportation Department (AHTD) the route begins at Louisiana Highway 3 at the Louisiana state line. It runs north parallel to the Union Pacific tracks, intersecting AR 160 in Bradley and US 82 in Lewisville. The route has multiple important junctions in Hope. The route meets US 67, US 278, US 371, and Interstate 30 in Hope. The route concurs with US 278 and runs around Hope as Bill Clinton Drive. In Nevada County, the route begins a concurrency with AR 19. AR 29 meets AR 301, before terminating at that same route in Antoine. The  in Pike County makes the total route length .

The route terminated at Blevins in 1947.

Major intersections

Hope business route

Arkansas Highway 29 Business is a  business route in Hope. It passes the Missouri Pacific Railroad Depot-Hope and the Ethridge House, both on the National Register of Historic Places. The route was designated after 1962.

See also

 List of state highways in Arkansas

References

External links

029
Transportation in Lafayette County, Arkansas
Transportation in Hempstead County, Arkansas
Transportation in Nevada County, Arkansas
Transportation in Pike County, Arkansas
Hope micropolitan area